The Federation of Liberals (FdL) was a minor liberal political party in Italy.

The party was founded on 6 February 1994 as the legal successor of the Italian Liberal Party (PLI): Alfredo Biondi, incumbent president of the PLI, was elected president and Raffaello Morelli coordinator. In the 1994 general election most FdL members supported Patto Segni, while Biondi (and some of the Liberals gathered in the Union of the Centre) were elected with Forza Italia. The FdL failed to file lists for the subsequent European Parliament election.

In 1995 the party was joined by the Liberal Democratic Union, whose leader Valerio Zanone was elected president, replacing Antonio Baslini.

In the 1996 general election Zanone and Morelli sided the FdL with The Olive Tree and, more specifically, with Democratic Union. In the 1999 European Parliament election the party formed a joint list with the Italian Republican Party. In both cases no Liberals were elected.

In the 2001 general election the FdL sided with Democracy is Freedom (DL). Zanone, a keen supporter of that alliance, joined DL's national board in 2002 and was elected to the Senate in the 2006 general election, while Morelli was more critical. The majority of the party sided with the latter, but the final fracture with Zanone happened only in 2005. In the meantime, in the 2004 European Parliament election the FdL had formed joint lists with the Federation of Liberal Democrats.

After that, the party, which is still active and more recently took part in European Choice for the 2014 European Parliament election, has suffered a steady decline.

Leadership
President: Alfredo Biondi (1994), Antonio Baslini (1994–1995), Valerio Zanone (1995–2004), Raffaello Morelli (2005–c.2014)
Coordinator/Secretary: Raffello Morelli (1994–2005)

References

External links
Official website
Former official website

Defunct political parties in Italy
1994 establishments in Italy
Centrist parties in Italy
Liberal parties in Italy
Political parties established in 1994
Social liberal parties
2014 disestablishments in Italy
Political parties disestablished in 2014